Hopefield was a small community on the Mississippi River in Crittenden County, Arkansas. It is near West Memphis, Arkansas. It was served by a ferry and a rail line extending to Madison, Arkansas. During the American Civil War General Stephen Hurlbut ordered the town burned to combat rebel activity. It was rebuilt, hit by a series of Yellow Fever epidemics, and diminished by erosion. Hopefield Chute, an Ox Bow also called Dacus Lake,  and Hopefield Lake are in the area as well as some remains. G. W. Watson moved there.

The area was once known as Camp Esperanza under Spanish rule. In the 1840s there were plans to develop land in the area. Several locations in the area were surveyed and marked.

An 1880 report discusses the area being quarantined with mounted men stationed to patrol it.

References

Ghost towns in Arkansas
Geography of Crittenden County, Arkansas